Playing a partial season in 1931, the La Feria Nighthawks were a minor league baseball team based in La Feria, Texas. La Feria played as members of the Class D level Rio Grande Valley League in their only season of minor league play. The team was established when the Corpus Christi Seahawks franchise moved to La Feria during the season. The Nighthawks won the second–half pennant and lost in the league finals. La Feria played home games in Harlingen, Texas.

History
In 1931, the Class D level Rio Grande Valley League began the season with the Corpus Christi Seahawks, Harlingen Ladds, McAllen Palms and the San Benito Saints playing as charter members. The league began play on April 22, 1931.

On June 4, 1931, the Corpus Christi Seagulls moved to La Feria. Corpus Christi had a record of 20–23 at the time of the move.

La Feria played their first home game on June 10, 1931, hosting home games at Harlingen.

During their first season of league play, the Rio Grande Valley League folded on July 30. Despite folding, the league held finals that featured La Feria. The Nighthawks finished the season in 2nd place overall, qualifying for the playoffs by winning the second–half title in the split–schedule season. The Nighthawks finished the 1931 overall regular season with a record of 49–46, playing under managers Ray Pipkin and Fincher Withers. McAllen won the 1st half pennant and finished 7.5 games ahead of the Seahawks/Nighthawks in the final overall standings. In the 1931 finals, the Nighthawks lost to the McAllen Palms, who swept La Feria in three games.

Johnny Rizzo won the Rio Grande Valley League batting championship, hitting .385.

Following the 1931 season, the Rig Grande Valley League folded. La Feria, Texas has not hosted another minor league team.

The ballpark
The name of the ballpark for 1931 home La Feria Nighthawks minor league games is unknown. The club played their home games at Harlingen, Texas.

Year–by–year records

Notable alumni
Johnny Rizzo (1931)

References

External links
 Baseball Reference

Defunct minor league baseball teams
Professional baseball teams in Texas
Defunct baseball teams in Texas
Baseball teams established in 1931
Baseball teams disestablished in 1931
1931 establishments in Texas
1931 disestablishments in Texas
Cameron County, Texas
Defunct Rio Grande Valley League teams
Sports in the Rio Grande Valley